Protomelas marginatus is a species of cichlid endemic to Lake Malawi where it prefers shallow, vegetated waters.  This species can reach a length of  TL.  It can also be found in the aquarium trade.

References

marginatus
Fish of Lake Malawi
Fish of Malawi
Fish described in 1935
Taxonomy articles created by Polbot